Andy's Frozen Custard is a chain of American frozen custard stores with locations in Arizona, Arkansas, Colorado, Florida, Georgia, Illinois, Kansas, Louisiana, Missouri, North Carolina, Oklahoma, South Carolina, Tennessee, and Texas. 

The company is headquartered in Springfield, Missouri, where the company is run by its namesake, Andy Kuntz. The company specializes in frozen custard-based desserts. In 2009, readers of 417 Magazine voted Andy's as the best thing about area code 417.

History

Andy's was founded by John and Carol Kuntz in 1986 in Osage Beach, Missouri, after the couple first tasted frozen custard in Wisconsin. They sought the mentorship of Leon and Doris Schneider, who had owned a Milwaukee frozen custard shop since 1942; Leon provided much of the knowledge and guidance the Kuntzes needed to open their own store. The shop was named after their son Andy.

Soon after, the operation expanded to Springfield, Missouri, where Andy, with his wife Dana, learned the frozen custard business. In 2008, John died, and Andy, Dana, and Carol continue to run the business.

Locations
, Andy's has 90+ locations in fourteen states: Arizona, Arkansas, Colorado, Florida, Georgia, Illinois, Kansas, Louisiana, Missouri, North Carolina, Oklahoma, South Carolina, Tennessee, and Texas. More locations are currently planned and coming soon.  The location in Colorado is one of the newest, with the first Andy's Frozen Custard in the Denver area opening as store #36 on September 14, 2011. Currently, they have franchise development agreements in place for Phoenix, Arizona, as well as parts of North Carolina and Florida.

In 2012, Andy's announced the flavor of the Boomer Bear Concrete, a dessert created to support Missouri State University's athletics program and named after the school's mascot. It is available in Andy's Springfield, Missouri, locations.

In 2015, Andy's signed a multi-franchise agreement and the largest in its 29 year history. This will result in 20 new stores found in Tulsa and Oklahoma City, Oklahoma; Dallas, Texas; Nashville, Tennessee, and various markets in Central Florida.

See also
 List of frozen custard companies
 Andes (disambiguation)

References

External links
 EatAndys.com

Companies based in Springfield, Missouri
Economy of the Western United States
Regional restaurant chains in the United States
Fast-food chains of the United States
Restaurants established in 1986
Fast-food franchises
Frozen custard
Ice cream parlors in the United States
1986 establishments in Missouri